Innocent is the third Korean EP by South Korean girl group Rainbow. The album was released in South Korea on February 25, 2015 with "Black Swan" as the lead single. It marked their first comeback  after a year and eight month of hiatus since 2013's Rainbow Syndrome.

Background
On February 11, Rainbow has revealed their image teaser with the concept that "Elegant". Then on February 15, the group teaser a style film about their album. In the clip, each member is outfitted in a unique all white dress shedding their girl-next-door image for a more mature tone. As previously noted, the girls are taking on a luxurious vibe this time. The video gives off a sultry, feminine aura that is very elegant. The full music video of lead track "Black Swan" was released on February 23.

Promotions
Rainbow began their promotion from Mnet's M! Countdown on February 26, then continue with various music show.

However, according to DSP Media on March 11 through Rainbow‘s fan café, Rainbow is wrapping up their “Black Swan” promotions after just two weeks. The agency said: “''With last week’s music show, [Rainbow’s] ‘Black Swan’ promotions have come to an end. Many thanks to all the fans who supported Rainbow’s third mini album, and we’ll work hard to return new and improved. Thank you.”'
The songs were unable to give them a spot in the top 100 and failed to garner significant interest, resulting in the early termination of promotions.

Track listing

Charts

Sales

Release history

References

External links 
  

2015 EPs
Rainbow (girl group) EPs
DSP Media albums
Kakao M EPs
Korean-language EPs